Svend Grønlund (22 March 1893 – 9 May 1977) was a Danish philatelist who was added to the Roll of Distinguished Philatelists in 1964.

References

Signatories to the Roll of Distinguished Philatelists
1893 births
1977 deaths
Danish philatelists